Professor Toma Macovei (July 23, 1911 – April 25, 2003) was born in Ghergheasa, Romania, and lived in Mizil. He joined the Army at a young age and served as an officer for 14 years. He was knighted for his heroism in fighting for Romanian liberation.

After completing seminary studies, he became a professor of philosophy and languages. He learned Interlingua in 1982 and contributed many articles to Interlingua periodicals. In 1988, he compiled his first book in Interlingua, Le Vita Anecdotic del Homines Illustre (The Anecdotal Life of Illustrious Men), followed by Ab le Auro Spiritual del Scena e del Schermo (From the Spiritual Gold of the Stage and the Screen) in 1991, Joieles Spiritual (Spiritual Jewels) in 1995, and Miscellanea, Insolite Creationes Spiritual (Miscellanea, Unusual Spiritual Creations) in 1996. At least 10 other manuscripts by Macovei are currently awaiting publication.

In 1999 and 2000, he completed the Dictionario Encyclopedic de Interlingua (Encyclopedic Dictionary of Interlingua). This manuscript also awaits publication as editors consider ways to transfer the enormous, typewritten volume into digital format.

See also

 Interlingua dictionaries

References
 Historia de Interlingua: Communication Sin Frontieras. Biographia, Toma Macovei.

1911 births
2003 deaths
Interlingua speakers
People from Buzău County
Romanian Land Forces officers